Raul Mälk (Born 14 May 1952 in Pärnu, Estonia) is an Estonian diplomat and a former Minister of Foreign Affairs of Estonia. He was also head of the Estonian delegation for border negotiations with Russia from 1992 to 2005. Up to 2007 he was Chairman of the Board of International Centre for Defence Studies in Estonia.

Mälk graduated cum laude from Tartu State University with a degree in economic cybernetics. From 1992 until 1993, Mälk was an advisor to the Minister of Foreign Affairs. From 1993 until 1994, he was the Chief of the Minister's Office. From 1994 until 1996, he was the Vice-Chancellor for Political and Press Affairs, and from 1996 until 2001, he was the Estonian ambassador to the United Kingdom, during which period, from 14 October 1998 until  25 March 1999 (after the resignation of Toomas Hendrik Ilves), he was also Minister of Foreign Affairs. Between 2003 and 2006, he was the ambassador to the Republic of Ireland.

References 

1952 births
Living people
People from Pärnu
Ministers of Foreign Affairs of Estonia
Ambassadors of Estonia to the United Kingdom
Ambassadors of Estonia to Ireland
University of Tartu alumni
Recipients of the Order of the White Star, 3rd Class